This is a list of people with the surname Carrey.

 Jacques Carrey (1649–1726), French artist who sketched the Parthenon frieze
 Jim Carrey (born 1962), Canadian film star of French extraction

See also
 Cary (surname), a similar name
 Carry (disambiguation)
 Cary (disambiguation)
 List of people with surname Carey, a similar name
 Evolution of the Carrey (or Carey) surname in France
 

Lists of people by surname